István Lakatos (born 4 April 1999) is a Hungarian football player who plays for Szolnok.

Statistics

Club

Updated to games played as of 23 August 2015.

References

External links

1999 births
Living people
Footballers from Budapest
Hungarian footballers
Association football wingers
Ferencvárosi TC footballers
Soroksár SC players
FC Ajka players
Szolnoki MÁV FC footballers
Nemzeti Bajnokság I players
Nemzeti Bajnokság II players
Nemzeti Bajnokság III players
21st-century Hungarian people